Jerinov Grič is a small settlement in the hills southwest of Vrhnika in the Inner Carniola region of Slovenia.

History
The remnants of a Roman wall are located in Jerinov Grič. The name of the adjacent village of Prezid (literally, 'before the wall') reflects this.

References

External links

Jerinov Grič on Geopedia

Populated places in the Municipality of Vrhnika